China Railway Wuhan Group, officially abbreviated as CR Wuhan or CR-Wuhan, formerly, Wuhan Railway Administration is a subsidiaries company under the jurisdiction of the China Railway (formerly the Ministry of Railway). As of 2007, the bureau is in charge of a total length of 6390.7 kilometers, and commercial length of 2709.2 kilometers of railways. It oversees 265 stations and manages the railways in Hubei and southern Henan Provinces.
It also manages the Wuhan Railway Hub, one of the eight biggest railway hubs, and one of the six biggest passenger hubs in China. The railway administration was reorganized as a company in November 2017.

Hub stations
 Wuhan
 Xiangyang

Regional services

C-train services

References

External links 
 Official website

Ministry of Railways of China
Rail transport in Hubei
Rail transport in Henan
China Railway Corporation